Tillandsia colganii is a species in the genus Tillandsia. This species is endemic to Bolivia.

References

colganii
Flora of Bolivia